The 2016–17 DFB-Pokal was the 74th season of the annual German football cup competition. Sixty-four teams participated in the competition, including all teams from the previous year's Bundesliga and the 2. Bundesliga. It began on 19 August 2016 with the first of six rounds and ended on 27 May 2017 with the final at the Olympiastadion in Berlin, a nominally neutral venue, which has hosted the final since 1985. The DFB-Pokal is considered the second-most important club title in German football after the Bundesliga championship. The DFB-Pokal is run by the German Football Association (DFB).

The defending champions were Bundesliga side Bayern Munich, after they beat Borussia Dortmund 4–3 on penalties in the previous final. Bayern Munich were knocked out of the competition in the semi-finals by Borussia Dortmund, the eventual winners, losing 2–3.

Borussia Dortmund defeated Eintracht Frankfurt 2–1 in the final to claim their fourth title.

Borussia Dortmund, the winners of the DFB-Pokal had already earned automatic qualification for the group stage of the 2017–18 edition of the UEFA Champions League through position in the Bundesliga. Therefore, the Europa League group stage spot went to the team in sixth, Hertha BSC, and the league's third qualifying round spot to the team in seventh, SC Freiburg. Dortmund also hosted the 2017 edition of the DFL-Supercup at the start of the 2017–18 season, when they faced the champion of the 2016–17 Bundesliga, Bayern Munich.

Participating clubs
The following 64 teams qualified for the competition:

Format

Participation
The DFB-Pokal began with a round of 64 teams. The 36 teams of the Bundesliga and 2. Bundesliga, along with the top four finishers of the 3. Liga were automatically qualified for the tournament. Of the remaining slots, 21 are given to the cup winners of the regional football associations, the Verbandspokal. The three remaining slots were given to the three regional associations with the most men's teams, which currently is Bavaria, Lower Saxony, and Westphalia. The runner-up of the Lower Saxony Cup was given the slot, along with the best-placed amateur team of the Regionalliga Bayern. For Westphalia, the winner of a play-off between the best-placed team of the Regionalliga West and Oberliga Westfalen also qualified. As every team was entitled to participate in local tournaments which qualify for the association cups, every team can in principle compete in the DFB-Pokal. Reserve teams and combined football sections are not permitted to enter, along with no two teams of the same association or corporation.

Draw
The draws for the different rounds were conducted as following:

For the first round, the participating teams were split into two pots of 32 teams each. The first pot contained all teams which have qualified through their regional cup competitions, the best four teams of the 3. Liga, and the bottom four teams of the 2. Bundesliga. Every team from this pot was drawn to a team from the second pot, which contained all remaining professional teams (all the teams of the Bundesliga and the remaining fourteen 2. Bundesliga teams). The teams from the first pot were set as the home team in the process.

The two-pot scenario was also applied for the second round, with the remaining 3. Liga and/or amateur team(s) in the first pot and the remaining Bundesliga and 2. Bundesliga teams in the other pot. Once again, the 3. Liga and/or amateur team(s) served as hosts. This time the pots did not have to be of equal size though, depending on the results of the first round. Theoretically, it was even possible that there may be only one pot, if all of the teams from one of the pots from the first round beat all the others in the second pot. Once one pot is empty, the remaining pairings were drawn from the other pot with the first-drawn team for a match serving as hosts.

For the remaining rounds, the draw was conducted from just one pot. Any remaining 3. Liga and/or amateur team(s) were the home team if drawn against a professional team. In every other case, the first-drawn team served as hosts.

Match rules
Teams met in one game per round. Matches took place for 90 minutes, with two halves of 45 minutes. If still tied after regulation, 30 minutes of extra time was played, consisting of two periods of 15 minutes. If the score was still level after this, the match was decided by a penalty shoot-out. A coin toss decided who took the first penalty.

A total of seven players were allowed to be listed on the substitute bench. For the first two rounds of the competition, a maximum of three players could be substituted, regardless of whether the match went into extra time. However, after a proposal by the German Football Association, the IFAB approved the use of a fourth substitute in extra time as part of a pilot project. This rule went into effect starting with the round of 16 onwards.

Suspensions
If a player received five yellow cards in the competition, he was then suspended from the next cup match. Similarly, receiving a second yellow card suspended a player from the next cup match. If a player received a direct red card, they were suspended a minimum of one match, but the German Football Association reserved the right to increase the suspension.

Champion qualification
The winner of the DFB-Pokal earns automatic qualification for the group stage of next year's edition of the UEFA Europa League. As winners Borussia Dortmund had already qualified for the UEFA Champions League by finishing 3rd in the Bundesliga, the spot went to the team in sixth, Hertha BSC, and the league's second qualifying round spot went to the team in seventh, SC Freiburg. As winner, Dortmund also hosted the 2017 DFL-Supercup at the start of the next season, and faced the champion of the previous year's Bundesliga, Bayern Munich.

Schedule

The rounds of the 2016–17 competition were scheduled as follows:

Matches
A total of sixty-three matches took place, starting with the first round on 19 August 2016, and culminating with the final on 27 May 2017 at the Olympiastadion in Berlin.

Times up to 29 October 2016 and from 26 March 2017 are CEST (UTC+2). Times from 30 October 2016 to 25 March 2017 are CET (UTC+1).

First round
The draw was held on 18 June 2016 at 23:30. Caroline Siems drew the games.

Second round
The draw was held on 26 August 2016 at 22:45, with Oliver Bierhoff drawing the games.

Round of 16
The draw was held on 26 October 2016 at 23:45, with Fabian Hambüchen drawing the games.

Quarter-finals
The draw took place on 8 February 2017 at 23:15, with Mark Forster drawing the games.

Semi-finals
The draw took place on 1 March 2017 at 23:15, with Matthias Sammer drawing the games.

Final

The final took place on 27 May 2017 at the Olympiastadion in Berlin.

Bracket
The following is the bracket which the DFB-Pokal resembled. Numbers in parentheses next to the match score represent the results of a penalty shoot-out.

Top goalscorers
The following are the top scorers of the DFB-Pokal, sorted first by number of goals, and then alphabetically if necessary. Goals scored in penalty shoot-outs are not included.

Notes

References

External links
 
DFB-Pokal on kicker.de 

2016-17
2016–17 in German football cups